Sorkin is a matronymic Russian-Jewish surname (meaning "son of Sarah"). Variants: Surkin, Syrkin.

It may refer to:
Aaron Benjamin Sorkin (born 1961), American screenwriter, producer, and playwright
Andrew Ross Sorkin (born 1977), American journalist
Arleen Sorkin (born 1956), American actress
David Sorkin, American historian
Ira Lee Sorkin (born 1943), American attorney
Ihor Sorkin (born 1967), chairman of the National Bank of Ukraine.
Leonard Sorkin (1916–1985), American violinist
Michael Sorkin (1948–2020), American architect
Naum Sorkin (1899–1980), Soviet general
Rafael Dolnick Sorkin (born 1945), American  physicist
Roman Sorkin (born 1996), Israeli basketball player

See also 
 Sorokin
 Zeitlin
 Sarasohn (Sarason)

Russian-language surnames
Matronymic surnames
Russian-Jewish surnames